Turbonilla alfredi is a species of sea snail, a marine gastropod mollusk in the family Pyramidellidae, the pyrams and their allies.

Description
The shell grows to a length of 7.5 mm.

Distribution
This marine species occurs off the Grand Cayman Island, Virgin Islands: St. Croix at depths between 2.4 m and 2.7 m.

References

External links
 To Encyclopedia of Life
 To ITIS
 To World Register of Marine Species

alfredi
Gastropods described in 1958